Nehru Park may refer to: 

 Nehru Park, Burnpur located in Burnpur, West Bengal, India
 Nehru Park, Chennai, at Egmore, in Chennai, India
 Nehru Park, Delhi (established 1969), at Chanakyapuri, in New Delhi, India
 Nehru Park, Paravur, public park in Paravur, Kollam Metropolitan Area, India
 Kamala Nehru Park, Mumbai located in Mumbai's Malabar Hill, India
 Kamala Nehru Park, Pune located in Pune, Maharashtra, India
 Nehru Zoological Park large zoo located in Hyderabad, Andhra Pradesh, India
 Nehru Park Guwahati, Guwahati, Assam, India